The 2015–16 season is the 128th competitive association football season in India.

International

League

Indian Super League

Finals

I-League

Changes in the I-League
Teams promoted to the 2015–16 I-League:
 Aizawl

Teams relegated from the 2015–16 I-League:
 Dempo

Transfers

I-League 2nd division

References

 
Seasons in Indian football